The Newcastle Street Circuit is a temporary street circuit around the east end of Newcastle, New South Wales, Australia. The circuit hosts the Newcastle 500, the opening round of the Supercars Championship. The 14-turn,  circuit takes in Newcastle Beach and the foreshore around Nobbys Beach Reserve.

Circuit
The circuit begins on Wharf Road, heading south-west towards the city. It then turns left at Watt Street, crossing over the Newcastle Light Rail tracks before ascending a 1:22 hill up Watt Street, before again turning left onto Shortland Esplanade  after turn one. Once on Shortland Esplanade, the circuit snakes down the beachside road before reaching a 90° left turn at Zaara Street. This is followed by a 90° right turn onto Scott Street and another 90° left turn onto Parnell Place to the fastest stretch of circuit, Nobbys Road down past Fort Scratchley followed by a left-handed hairpin bend in the Camp Shortland carpark. From there a right hand turn onto Wharf Road completes the lap.

The originally proposed layout was altered with the omission of the section through Pacific Park and the alteration of the planned Nobbys' Reserve permanent course. However, the circuit has attracted criticism from residents within the circuit precinct.

In 2019, the Camp Shortland hairpin bend was altered in order to improve overtaking. The corner apex moved to where the outside track limit point was initially situated and the corner radius was tightened, giving drivers a longer and deeper braking zone to complete passes.

Lap records

As of March 2023, the fastest official race lap records at Newcastle Street Circuit are listed as:

Notes

References

Motorsport venues in New South Wales
Newcastle 500
Sport in Newcastle, New South Wales
Supercars Championship circuits
2017 establishments in Australia